Running for My Life is the 13th studio album by American singer and songwriter Judy Collins, released by Elektra Records in 1980. It peaked at No. 142 on the Billboard Pop Albums charts.

The version of  "Marieke" found here is a new recording.

Track listing
 "Running for My Life" (Judy Collins)
 "Bright Morning Star" (Arranged and adapted by Judy Collins)
 "Green Finch and Linnet Bird" (Stephen Sondheim)
 "Marieke" (Jacques Brel, Gérard Jouannest) 
 "Pretty Women" (Stephen Sondheim)
 "Almost Free" (Hugh Prestwood)
 "I Could Really Show You Around" (Peter Allen, Dean Pitchford)
 "I've Done Enough Dyin' Today" (Larry Gatlin)
 "Anyone Would Love You" (Harold Rome)
 "The Rainbow Connection" (Kenneth Ascher, Paul Williams)
 "This Is the Day" (Judy Collins)
 "Wedding Song" (Judy Collins)

Personnel
Judy Collins – vocals, guitar, piano
Tom Barney – bass
Lou Volpe – guitar
Bob Cranshaw – bass
Warren Doze – drums
Bob Christianson – synthesizer
Thomas Bogoan – vocals
Steve Clayton – vocals
Leslie Dorsey – vocals
Charles Magruder – vocals
June Magruder – vocals
Helene Miles – vocals
Lenny Roberts – vocals
David Smith – vocals
Thomas Texter – vocals

References

Judy Collins albums
1980 albums
Elektra Records albums